The Suwanee Half Marathon (formerly branded as the Suwanee Gateway Half Marathon) is an annual USATF certified half marathon road running race.  It was established in 2015 and has been run every year since. It passes through landmarks such as Suwanee Town Center, Suwanee Creek Greenway and George Pierce Park. The course USATF certification is GA14090WC and is a qualifier for the Peachtree Road Race, the world’s largest  race. Performance Race Services administers the half marathon and the 5K that shortly follows it known as the Old Town 5K.

Course description
The race route begins at the Suwanee City Hall. It covers a mixture of hilly and flat terrain as runners travel throughout Suwanee and end at the Suwanee Town Center Park. The distance is a 13.1 mile trek. All runners receive a finisher’s medal and a long-sleeved shirt, and custom fleece blanket (new design each year).

Past winners
Key:

External links
Suwanee Half Marathon
Race reports: 2015, 2016, 2017

References 

Annual sporting events in the United States
Half marathons in the United States
February sporting events
Recurring sporting events established in 2015
Tourist attractions in Gwinnett County, Georgia
 
Suwanee, Georgia
2015 establishments in Georgia (U.S. state)